Laives is a commune in the Saône-et-Loire department in the region of Bourgogne-Franche-Comté in eastern France.

Geography
The river Grison forms most of the commune's western border, then flows into the Grosne, which forms the commune's northwestern border.

See also
Communes of the Saône-et-Loire department

References

Communes of Saône-et-Loire